Hudsonville is an unincorporated community in Marshall County, Mississippi, United States. It is located in the hill country of north Mississippi. The Mississippi Central Railroad runs through Hudsonville.

Hudsonville was located along the "Wet Weather Trail" which followed a series of ridges between present-day Pontotoc and Memphis. This route enabled Indians and early pioneers to avoid dangerous river crossings and swamps during periods of wet weather.

Major Thoroughfares
 Mississippi Highway 7
 Mississippi Highway 313

Notable people
 Junior Kimbrough, blues musician.
 Sam Lumpkin, 21st Lieutenant Governor of Mississippi.

References

Unincorporated communities in Marshall County, Mississippi
Unincorporated communities in Mississippi
Memphis metropolitan area